V598 Puppis is the name given to a nova in the Milky Way Galaxy. USNO-A2.0 0450-03360039, the catalog number for the star, was discovered to be much brighter than normal in X-ray emissions on October 9, 2007, by the European Space Agency's XMM-Newton telescope. Ultimately, the star was confirmed to 600 times brighter than normal by the Magellan-Clay telescope Magellan-Clay telescope at Las Campanas Observatory in Chile.

The nova has been officially named V598 Puppis and is "one of the brightest for almost a decade". Despite its brightness, the nova was apparently missed by amateur and professional astronomers alike until XMM-Newton spotted the unusual X-ray source while turning from one target to another.  The All Sky Automated Survey determined that that nova had occurred on June 5, 2007.

The orbital period of the two stars in V598 Puppis is 0.1628714 days, or 3 hours, 54 minutes, and 32 seconds.

References

Novae
Puppis
Puppis, V598
20071009
J07054250-3814394